La vallée fantôme (also known as The Ghost Valley and The Phantom Valley) is a 1987 French-Swiss drama film  written and directed by Alain Tanner and starring  Jean-Louis Trintignant, Jacob Berger and Laura Morante.

The film was entered into the main competition at the 44th edition of the Venice Film Festival.

Plot

Cast  
 Jean-Louis Trintignant as Paul
 Jacob Berger as Jean
 Laura Morante as Dara
 Caroline Cartier as Madeleine
 Raymond Serra as Dara's Father
 Jane Holzer as Jane
 Françoise Michaud  as The Casting Director
 Anouk Grinberg

References

External links

1987 drama films
1987 films
Films directed by Alain Tanner
French drama films
Swiss drama films
1980s French-language films
French-language Swiss films
1980s French films